Santiago Alejo Cánepa is an Argentine handball player for Sociedad Alemana de Villa Ballester, Handebol Taubaté, Aranda and the Argentine national team.

He represented Argentina at the 2021 World Men's Handball Championship.

References

1991 births
Living people
Argentine male handball players
Expatriate handball players
Argentine expatriate sportspeople in Brazil
21st-century Argentine people